Anthia limbata is a species of ground beetle in the subfamily Anthiinae. It was described by Pierre François Marie Auguste Dejean in 1831.

References

Anthiinae (beetle)
Beetles described in 1831